The Brightest Star in the Sky is a 2019 Chinese streaming television series starring Huang Zitao and Janice Wu. It is a coming-of-age story featuring love, friendship, and music, set in the backdrop of the musical industry. It aired on Tencent, iQiyi, and Youku from March 25 to May 6, 2019.

Synopsis
Star Entertainment is the top entertainment agency in China. It was set up by a couple, Cheng Tianhao and Du Wanqing, who eventually separated due to differing beliefs in managing the company. Yang Zhenzhen is an aspiring young girl with a passion for music. She joined Starry Sky Entertainment and was assigned as Zheng Boxu's assistant. Boxu is a popular idol who is arrogant and unruly. With the help of Zhenzhen, who helped him correct his flaws and unleash his potential, Boxu slowly transforms into a talented singer. In the process, Zhenzhen also gains experience and becomes a capable idol manager. At the same time, Du Wanqing is also grooming a singer, Yu Zirui, who shapes up to become Boxu's biggest competitor yet.

Cast

 Huang Zitao as Zheng Boxu
 A popular idol singer who is arrogant and unruly. He has a passion for music and a relentless persistence to prove his worth as a singer.
 Janice Wu as Yang Zhenzhen
 An aspiring artist manager with a love for music.
 Niu Junfeng as Yu Zirui
 An up-and-coming singer who achieved what he has through hard work and persistence.
 Cao Xiyue as Xia Yuan
 Zhenzhen's close friend. Yu Zirui's assistant. 
 Qin Lan as Fang Yiran
 Zheng Boxu's older sister.
 Wang Jinsong as Zheng Yajun
 Zheng Boxu's father.
 Wei Daxun as Wandering singer.
 Emotion Cheung as Gu Ye
 Owner of a snack shop, which Yang Zhenzhen often frequents he also helped three important people to get where they are now.
 David Chen as Chen Tianhao
 Founder and CEO of Star Entertainment. Du Wanqing's husband.
 Liu Jia as Du Wanqing
 Founder and CEO of Star Entertainment. Chen Tianhao's wife.
 Huang Zheng as Chang Ran
 Music producer and co-founder of Star Entertainment.
 Li Yiling as Yu Hong
 Artist manager of Star Entertainment.
 Lang Feng as Liu Yinan
 Promotions manager of Star Entertainment.
 Chen Xi as Sun Yuqi
 Zheng Boxu's ex-manager. Yu Hong's sister.
 Zhao Yihuan as Ma Lina
 A new boss who joined the company and Du Wanqing's enemy.
 Guan Yue as Amanda
 Ma Zehan as Zhang Xiaohui
 Zheng Boxu's Crazy fan.
 Jiang Long as Gu Bin
 Yu Zirui's close friend.
 Sun Xiaoming as Jason
 Zheng Boxu's makeup artist.
 Ye Lina as Xiao Jian
 Zheng Boxu's ex-assistant.
 Yang Zhiying as Ye Kexin
 She is in love with Zheng Boxu.

Production
The drama was filmed from June 16, 2017 to October 9, 2017. A 4000 square meter set was built from scratch for the drama. The drama was filmed in Beijing, Los Angeles, Ensenada, Baja California, and Cancún .

Huang Zitao acts as the music director of the drama.

Soundtrack

Opening Song: Beggar by Huang Zitao

Ending Song: 好不好 by Huang Zitao

Other Songs used in the drama:

Reluctantly (舍不得) by Huang Zitao

Expose (揭穿) by Huang Zitao

Collateral Love by Huang Zitao

Promise by Huang Zitao

Awards and nominations

References

2019 Chinese television series debuts
2019 Chinese television series endings
Chinese romantic comedy television series
Chinese music television series
Youku original programming
Tencent original programming
IQIYI original programming
Chinese web series
2019 web series debuts
Television series by Tencent Pictures